The Vilayet of Beirut was a first-level administrative division (vilayet) of the Ottoman Empire. It was established from the coastal areas of the Syria Vilayet in 1888 as a recognition of the new-found importance of its then-booming capital, Beirut, which had experienced remarkable growth in the previous years — by 1907, Beirut handled 11 percent of the Ottoman Empire's international trade. It stretched from just north of Jaffa to the port city of Latakia. It was bounded by the Syria Vilayet to the east, the Aleppo Vilayet to the north, the autonomous Mutasarrifate of Jerusalem to the south and the Mediterranean Sea to the west.

It was the 4th most heavily populated region of the Ottoman Empire's 36 provinces.

Administrative divisions
Sanjaks of the vilayet:
 Latakia Sanjak
 Tripoli Sanjak
 Beirut Sanjak
 Akka Sanjak
 Nablus Sanjak

Maps

See also
 Mount Lebanon Mutasarrifate
 Mutasarrifate of Jerusalem

References

External links
 

Vilayets of the Ottoman Empire in Asia
History of Beirut
1888 establishments in the Ottoman Empire
1917 disestablishments in the Ottoman Empire